
Year 227 BC was a year of the pre-Julian Roman calendar. At the time it was known as the Year of the Consulship of Flaccus and Regulus (or, less frequently, year 527 Ab urbe condita). The denomination 227 BC for this year has been used since the early medieval period, when the Anno Domini calendar era became the prevalent method in Europe for naming years.

Events 
 By place 
 Illyria 
 Queen Teuta of Illyria finally surrenders to Roman forces and is forced by the Romans to accept an ignominious peace. The Romans allow her to continue her reign but restrict her to a narrow region around the Illyrian capital, Shkodra, deprive her of all her other territory, and forbid her to sail an armed ship below Lissus just south of the capital. They also require her to pay an annual tribute and to acknowledge the final authority of Rome.

 Greece 
 The Macedonian regent, Antigonus III, marries the former king Demetrius II's widow, Phthia, and assumes the crown thus deposing the young Philip V.
 The Spartan King Cleomenes III imposes reforms on his kingdom which include the cancelling of debts, providing land for 4,000 citizens, and restoring the training of youth in the martial arts. Cleomenes' changes are designed to make the monarchy supreme and re-create a society of aristocrats, while neglecting Sparta's helots (serfs) and perioikoi (free but non-citizen inhabitants). Eighty opponents of the reforms are exiled, while his brother Eucleidas is installed as co-ruler in the place of the murdered Archidamus V.
 Cleomenes III defeats the Achaeans under Aratus of Sicyon at Mount Lycaeum and at Ladoceia near Megalopolis.

 Roman Republic 
 Sardinia and Corsica are made a combined province. Rome appoints, and in the future annually elects, two praetors (with autocratic consular powers) for this province and for Sicily.
 Gaius Flaminius becomes Rome's first governor of Sicily.

 Seleucid Empire 
 Antiochus Hierax tries to raise revolts against his brother Seleucus II in Syria and the east of the Seleucid kingdom. However, he is captured and exiled to Thrace, where he lives as a virtual prisoner.

 China 
 The Qin generals Wang Jian, Li Xin and Wang Ben invade the State of Yan in vengeance for an assassination attempt against the king of Qin, Ying Zheng, that had been organized by Crown Prince Dan.

Births 
 Publius Cornelius Scipio Nasica, Roman consul and general

Deaths 
 Huan Yi, Chinese general of the Qin State (Warring States Period)
 Jing Ke, Chinese retainer and assassin of the Yan State
 Lydiadas of Megalopolis, Greek tyrant and general (strategos)

References